ECLA can refer to
 European Company Lawyers Association
 United Nations Economic Commission for Latin America and the Caribbean, also abbreviated by UNECLAC or ECLAC now, previously called "United Nations Economic Commission for Latin America", or UNECLA.
 European Classification, a patent classification.
 European College of Liberal Arts, the former name of Bard College Berlin, a private college in Berlin, Germany
Emerson College Los Angeles

See also
 ELCA